408 Greenwich Street is a post-modern neoclassical condominium designed and built by Morris Adjmi Architects. It is located in the Tribeca neighborhood of Manhattan, New York City. The design of the building was inspired by Italian architect, Aldo Rossi. It is included in the Fifth Edition of the AIA Guide to New York City.

Notes

External links
 'Residential Real Estate; 9-Story Project Approved in TriBeCa Warehouse District'
 'Case Study: Samuel A. Ramirez Building, New York, NY'
 'On Greenwich Street, Second Try No Charm for Proposed Building'
 www.ma.com

Condominiums and housing cooperatives in Manhattan
Tribeca
Residential buildings completed in 2008